Jeannot Reiter (born 14 October 1958) is a retired football striker.

During his club career, Reiter played for FC Etzella Ettelbruck, FC Chalon, Guingamp, FC Montceau Bourgogne and Spora Luxembourg. He also amassed 46 caps for the Luxembourg national team, scoring 6 goals.

References

External links
 
 

1958 births
Living people
Luxembourgian footballers
Luxembourgian expatriate footballers
Luxembourg international footballers
Association football forwards
En Avant Guingamp players
FC Etzella Ettelbruck players
FC Chalon players
FC Montceau Bourgogne players
CA Spora Luxembourg players
Expatriate footballers in France
Luxembourgian expatriate sportspeople in France
Ligue 2 players
F91 Dudelange managers
FC Progrès Niederkorn managers
Union Luxembourg managers
FC Swift Hesperange managers
FC Avenir Beggen managers
FC Etzella Ettelbruck managers
US Mondorf-les-Bains managers